Erika Bertényi (born 18 March 1959) is a Hungarian rower. She competed in the women's quadruple sculls event at the 1988 Summer Olympics.

References

External links
 

1959 births
Living people
Hungarian female rowers
Olympic rowers of Hungary
Rowers at the 1988 Summer Olympics
People from Vác
Sportspeople from Pest County